Van Tichelt is a surname. Notable people with the surname include:

Bill Van Tichelt (born 1935), American businessman
Dirk Van Tichelt (born 1984), Belgian judoka

Surnames of Dutch origin